"Lonely If You Are" is a song recorded by American country music singer Chase Rice. It is the lead single to his fourth studio album The Album. Rice wrote the song with Lindsay Rimes and Hunter Phelps, and co-produced it with Chris DeStefano.

Content and history
Rice released the single in mid-2019. He wrote the song with Lindsay Rimes and Hunter Phelps. Featuring mainly acoustic guitar as the accompaniment, the song is described by Rice as "telling this special girl that even though we might not officially be together right now, 'go ahead, have a good time with your friends...but when that all fades away, give me a call. I’ll be there.'"

Rice promoted the song on an episode of The Bachelor on January 27, 2020. In the episode, Victoria Fuller attends a concert performed by Rice, whom she had previously dated. At the time of the episode, Rice was unaware that she would be in it. This episode led to a rumor that Rice wrote the song about Fuller, which he denied. Reid Long directed the music video, which was filmed at 20 Monroe Live, a music venue in Grand Rapids, Michigan. In it, several children portray the roles of Rice, his band, and his fans.

Chart performance

Weekly charts

Year-end charts

Certifications

References

2019 singles
2019 songs
Chase Rice songs
Songs written by Chase Rice
BBR Music Group singles
Songs written by Lindsay Rimes